Julio Vladimir Estrada León (born May 6, 1977, in Atotonilco de Tula, Hidalgo) is a Mexican football manager and former player.

External links

1977 births
Living people
Association football defenders
Atlas F.C. footballers
C.F. Monterrey players
La Piedad footballers
Querétaro F.C. footballers
Atlante F.C. footballers
C.F. Cobras de Querétaro players
Club Celaya footballers
C.D. Guadalajara footballers
Liga MX players
Ascenso MX players
Mexican football managers
Footballers from Hidalgo (state)
Mexican footballers